DYOG (882 AM) Radyo Pilipinas is a radio station owned and operated by Philippine Broadcasting Service. The station's studio is located in Butel Bldg., Calbayog.

References

Radio stations established in 1982
Radio stations in Samar (province)
Philippine Broadcasting Service